Brian Wyndham Lewis is a former educator, deputy minister in the Northwest Territories government, elected politician and speaker of the Northwest Territories Legislature.

Lewis and his family first moved to the Northwest Territories in 1963.
Lewis was first elected to the Northwest Territories Legislature in the 1987 Northwest Territories general election he won the Yellowknife Centre electoral district. He was re-elected in the 1991 Northwest Territories general election. Lewis ran for the position of speaker but was defeated by Jeannie Marie-Jewell. He became deputy speaker instead. On December 15, 1994 Jewell would resign as speaker and Lewis automatically became Acting Speaker. He held that position until February 15, 1995.

References

External links

Members of the Legislative Assembly of the Northwest Territories
Speakers of the Legislative Assembly of the Northwest Territories
Living people
People from Yellowknife
1936 births